Zinc finger, X-linked, duplicated family member C (ZXDC) is a human CIITA-binding protein involved in the activation of major histocompatibility complex (MHC) class I and II.  For binding to occur, ZXDC must form an oligomeric complex with another copy of itself or with ZXDA, a related protein.  ZXDC is activated by sumoylation, a post-translational modification.

External links
ZXDC at NIH NCBI
ZXDC at Uniprot
ZXDC GeneCard

References

Human proteins